Tilloclytus minutus is a species of longhorn beetle in the Cerambycinae subfamily. It was described by Fisher in 1932. It is known from Puerto Rico.

References

Anaglyptini
Beetles described in 1932